Dorothee Stapelfeldt (born 12 August 1956) is a German politician of the Social Democratic Party of Germany (SPD) who served in the governments of mayors Olaf Scholz and Peter Tschentscher of Hamburg, including as State Minister for Urban Development and Environment (2015–2022) and State Minister of Science and Research (2011–2015).

Early life and education
Stapelfeldt was born in 1956 in Hamburg. She took her school exam in 1975, and studied history of art, literary criticism, and social and economic history at the University of Hamburg. In 1989 she earned a doctorate.

Political career

Early beginnings
Stapelfeldt is a member of the (SPD). She has been a member of the Hamburg State Parliament since 1986, from 2000 to 2004 as its President. In 2007 she was in competition with Mathias Petersen for the position of top candidate for the Hamburg state election, but resigned after friction during an internal SPD election.

Career in state government
Between 2011 and 2015, Stapelfeldt served as Deputy Mayor of Hamburg as well as State Minister (Senator) for Science and Research in the state government of Mayor Olaf Scholz. In this capacity, she was one of the state's representatives at the Bundesrat. From 2015 to 2022, she served as State Minister for Urban Development and Housing.

In the negotiations to form a so-called traffic light coalition of the SPD, the Green Party and the FDP under Chancellor Olaf Scholz following the 2021 federal elections, Stapelfeldt was part of her party's delegation in the working group on building and housing, chaired by Kevin Kühnert, Christian Kühn and Daniel Föst.

Other activities

Corporate boards
 Hamburg Marketing Gesellschaft mbH (HMG GmbH), Ex-Officio Member of the Supervisory Board

Non-profit organizations
 Übersee Club, Member of the Board of Trustees
 German United Services Trade Union (ver.di), Member
 German Federation for the Environment and Nature Conservation (BUND), Member
 Rotary International, Member
 Hamburg Media School (HMS), Member of the Supervisory Board (2011-2015)

Personal life
Stapelfeldt is married, but living separated and has two children. She lives in Hamburg's Winterhude district.

References

External links

Website  (Retrieved on 2009-09-03)

1956 births
Living people
Members of the Hamburg Parliament
Social Democratic Party of Germany politicians
University of Hamburg alumni